Zaw Win (born 30 December 1994) is a footballer from Myanmar and a defender for Yangon United FC. He has represented the Myanmar national team.

References

External links
Yangon United

1994 births
Living people
Burmese footballers
Myanmar international footballers
Yangon United F.C. players
Association football defenders